Reddy is caste in India. It may also refer to:

As a surname 
 Reddy (surname)
 Reddy (Irish surname)

People with the given name or nickname 
 Reddy Foster (1864–1908), American baseball player
 Reddy Grey (1875–1934), American baseball player
 Reddy Mack (1866–1916), American baseball player
 Reddy Row (fl. early 1800s), Indian administrator
 Reddy Rowe (1887–1966), American college football coach
 Reddy (rapper), a stage name for South Korean rapper and singer

Fictional characters 
 R. U. Reddy (Winthrop Roan, Jr.), a mutant character in the Marvel Universe
 Reddy Kilowatt, a branding character for electricity generation company in the United States

May also refer to 
 Reddi Kingdom, a 14th- and 15th-century dynasty in southern India
 Reddy (album), a 1979 album by Helen Reddy
 Reddy (title), a title given to village headman